Mount Clemens High School was established in the 19th century.  It is located in Mount Clemens, Michigan, United States. It is a part of Mount Clemens Community Schools.

History
 1834 - Mount Clemens Community School District was formed
 1859 - Union School was built on present Macomb School site
 1924 - Mount Clemens High School opened on current site
 1967 - Mount Clemens High School addition  was built

Notable alumni
 Kim Adams, television news personality
 Wally Chambers, NFL football player
 Connie Kalitta, Hall of Fame race car driver

See also
 Mount Clemens Community Schools

References

External links
Mount Clemens Community Schools
Mount Clemens Battling Bathers historical football records

Public high schools in Michigan
Educational institutions established in 1859
Schools in Macomb County, Michigan
1859 establishments in Michigan